James Sewell may refer to:

 James Edwards Sewell (1810–1903), warden of New College, Oxford
 James Sewell, choreographer and founder of the James Sewell Ballet
 James Witt Sewell (1865–1955), writer and philosopher

See also
 James Sewall (1778–1842), commander in the War of 1812